Gísli Eyjólfsson (born 31 May 1994) is an Icelandic footballer who plays as a central midfielder for Breiðablik and the Iceland national team.

Career
Gísli Eyjólfsson made his international debut for Iceland on 29 May 2021 in a friendly match against Mexico in Arlington, Texas.

Career statistics

International

References

External links
 

1994 births
Living people
Gisli Eyjolfsson
Gisli Eyjolfsson
Gisli Eyjolfsson
Association football midfielders
Gisli Eyjolfsson
Gisli Eyjolfsson
Gisli Eyjolfsson
Mjällby AIF players
Gisli Eyjolfsson
Gisli Eyjolfsson
Gisli Eyjolfsson
Superettan players
Gisli Eyjolfsson
Gisli Eyjolfsson
Expatriate footballers in Sweden